ICQ May refer to:
ICQ, an instant messaging software
International Comet Quarterly (ICQ), a non-profit scientific journal
Islamic Council of Queensland (ICQ), a community organization in Australia
 Chenzhou West railway station, China Railway telegraph code ICQ